The Fiat AN.1 was an Italian two-seat biplane from 1930, best known as a demonstrator of Fiat's first aircraft diesel engine, also named the Fiat AN.1.

Design and development

The AN.1 was a two-seat reconnaissance aircraft built primarily to explore the suitability of diesel engines in tasks requiring long endurance flying. In the early 1930s, diesel engines seemed to offer several advantages in such situations, particularly better reliability because of greater mechanical simplicity and lower fuel consumption, because of greater thermodynamic efficiency.  Additionally, heavy oil fuel posed no fire risk and was at the time a fifth of the price of petrol.

The AN.1 used a Fiat-built engine of the same name, much of which was based on the Fiat A.12 petrol engine, but with a new compression ignition upper half. It was a conventional biplane design, though little is known of its details. It first flew in 1930.

Operational history

After some short test flights at Fiat's Turin works, the AN.1 made its first long-distance flight to Rome,  a distance of about 510 km (315  mi), piloted by Renato Donati in June 1930. This took it to Littorio Airport for an appearance on the first day of the Aerial Pageant.

Specifications

References

AN.1
1930s Italian aircraft
Diesel-engined aircraft
Aircraft first flown in 1930
Biplanes
Single-engined tractor aircraft